A pet cemetery is a cemetery for pets.

History
Many human cultures buried animal remains. For example, the Ancient Egyptians mummified and buried cats, which they considered deities, and the largest known dog cemetery in the ancient world was discovered at the Ashkelon National Park in Ashkelon, Israel.

London's Hyde Park was the site of an informal pet cemetery between 1881 and 1903, in the gatekeeper's garden. From the first burial of "Cherry" until its official closure in 1903, it received 300 burials with miniature headstones, with a final special burial of the Royal Marines mascot dog "Prince" in 1967.

Cimetière des Chiens in Asnières-sur-Seine in Paris, dating from 1899, is an elaborate, sculpted pet cemetery believed to be one of the first public zoological necropolis in the world.

America's largest and oldest pet cemetery is in Hartsdale, New York. It dates from 1896, when a veterinarian working out of Manhattan offered to let a grieving pet owner bury her dog in his hillside apple orchard. Today, it is the final resting place for more than 70,000 animals. The Hartsdale Pet Cemetery was listed on the National Register of Historic Places in 2012. Some other famous American pet cemeteries are Aspin Hill Memorial Park in Silver Spring, Maryland,  as well as the Pet Memorial Cemetery in Calabasas, California, where Hopalong Cassidy's horse, Topper, Steven Spielberg's Jack Russell Terrier, and Rudolph Valentino's dog, Kabar, are buried.

Burial options
At some cemeteries, such as Aspin Hill Memorial Park in Silver Spring, Maryland human and animal remains may be interred alongside each other. In January 2010, West Lindsey District Council gave permission for a site in the village of Stainton by Langworth to inter animal remains alongside human remains as part of a "green burial" site, making it the first place in England where pets could be buried alongside their owners.

Gallery

See also
Animal loss
Pet Sematary

References

External links

Founded in 1899, the oldest pet cemetery is near Paris, France
Virtual Pet Cemetery - Rainbow Bridge Pet Memorial
International Association Of Pet Cemeteries & Crematories
Interfaith Association of Animal Chaplains
Virtual Pet cemetery
A Virtual Pet cemetery
Pet Cemeteries – slideshow by Life magazine
Pet Cemetery Directory – for pet cemeteries across the US and Canada
Aspin Hill Pet Cemetery History
Pet Cemetery in Athens – animal burial unit under European license

Animal cemeteries
Animals and humans
Animal monuments